Social innovations are new social practices that aim to meet social needs in a better way than the existing solutions, resulting from - for example - working conditions, education, community development or health. These ideas are created with the goal of extending and strengthening civil society. Social innovation includes the social processes of innovation, such as open source methods and techniques and also the innovations which have a social purpose—like activism, virtual volunteering, microcredit, or distance learning. There are many definitions of social innovation, however, they usually include the broad criteria about social objectives, social interaction between actors or actor diversity, social outputs, and innovativeness (The innovation should be at least ”new” to the beneficiaries it targets, but it does not have to be new to the world). Different definitions include different combinations and different number of these criteria (e.g. EU is using definition stressing out social objectives and actors interaction). Transformative social innovation not only introduces new approaches to seemingly intractable problems, but is successful in changing the social institutions that created the problem in the first place.

According to Herrero de Egaña B., social innovation is defined as "new or novel ways that society has to deal with Relevant Social Challenges (RSCh), that are more effective, efficient and sustainable or that generate greater impact than the previous ones and that contribute to making it stronger and more articulated".

Prominent innovators associated with the term include Pakistani Akhter Hameed Khan, Bangladeshi Muhammad Yunus, the founder of Grameen Bank which pioneered the concept of microcredit for supporting innovations in many developing countries such as Asia, Africa and Latin America, and inspired programs like the Jindal Centre for Social Innovation & Entrepreneurship and Infolady Social Entrepreneurship Programme of Dnet (A Social Enterprise).

Focus and application
Social Innovation has an inter-sectoral approach and is universally applicable. Social Innovations are launched by a variety of actors, including research institutions, companies and independent organizations, which tend to use their respective definitions of Social Innovation. Therefore, it is worth discussing what distinguishes it from other forms of social work or innovation.

Social Innovation focuses on the process of innovation, how innovation and change take shape (as opposed to the more traditional definition of innovation, giving priority to the internal organization of firms and their productivity). It likewise centers on new work and new forms of cooperation (business models), especially on those that work towards the attainment of a sustainable society.

Social innovation can take place within government; the for-profit sector, the nonprofit sector (also known as the third sector), or in the spaces between them. Higher education institutions, such as the Cambridge Centre for Social Innovation, Cambridge Judge Business School, University of Cambridge, leverage the power of research to support this aim. Research has focused on the types of platforms needed to facilitate such cross-sector collaborative social innovation. Historical studies suggest that transforming any system may take many years, and requires not only the capacity for multiple partnerships, but also for engaging policy, legal and economic institutions.

Social entrepreneurship, like social enterprise, is typically in the nonprofit sector excluding both for-profit and public organizations. Both social entrepreneurship and social enterprise are important contributions to social innovation by creating social value and introducing new ways of achieving goals. Social entrepreneurship brings "new patterns and possibilities for innovation" and are willing to do things that existing organizations are not willing to do.

Social innovation success is often shaped by strategic alliances. Those startups motivated by a social mission can improve their business performance via equity and non-equity strategic alliances, to enhance growth and foster social innovation. However, sustainable growth requires to attract the right investments at the right stage of development of the startup. Cacciolatti et al. (2020) developed a framework based on international business theory to explain the mechanisms regulating strategic alliances and firm performance in the context of startups with a social mission.

Social innovation is often an effort of mental creativity which involves fluency and flexibility from a wide range of disciplines. The act of social innovation in a sector is mostly connected with diverse disciplines within the society. The social innovation theory of 'connected difference' emphasizes three key dimensions to social innovation. First, innovations are usually new combinations or hybrids of existing elements, rather than completely new. Second, their practice involves cutting across organizational or disciplinary boundaries. Lastly, they leave behind compelling new relationships between previously separate individuals and groups. Social innovation is also gaining visibility within academia.

Since 2014, a subdomain of social innovation has been defined in relation to the introduction of digital technologies. The subdomain is called digital social innovation and refers to "a type of social and collaborative innovation in which innovators, users and communities collaborate using digital technologies to co-create knowledge and solutions for a wide range of social needs and at a scale and speed that was unimaginable before the rise of the Internet".

History
Social innovation was discussed in the writings of figures such as Peter Drucker and Michael Young (founder of the Open University and dozens of other organizations) in the 1960s. It also appeared in the work of French writers in the 1970s, such as Pierre Rosanvallon, Jacques Fournier, and Jacques Attali. However, the themes and concepts in social innovation existed long before. Benjamin Franklin, for example, talked about small modifications within the social organization of communities that could help to solve everyday problems. Many radical 19th century reformers like Robert Owen, founder of the cooperative movement, promoted innovation in the social field and all of the great sociologists including Karl Marx, Max Weber and Émile Durkheim focused attention on broader processes of social change. In recent years, the work of Gabriel Tarde on the concept of imitation has been rediscovered by social scientists in order to better understand social innovation and its relation to social change. Other theories of innovation became prominent in the 20th century, many of which had social implications, without putting social progress at the center of the theory. Joseph Schumpeter, for example, addressed the process of innovation directly with his theory of creative destruction and his definition of entrepreneurs as people who combined existing elements in new ways to create a new product or service. Beginning in the 1980s, writers on technological change increasingly addressed how social factors affect technology diffusion.

The article "Rediscovering Social Innovation" mentions how social innovations are dependent on history and the change in institutions. The article discusses the ten recent social innovations reflecting current change to include:
 Charter schools: Charter schools are a social innovation that provides an alternative avenue for students to continue to develop and build upon their educational foundation without many of the issues prominent in the public school system. These primary and secondary schools are publicly funded and operate independently, which allows the teachers and parents to collaboratively develop alternative teaching methods for their students as related regulations are less stringent for Charter Schools.
 Community-centered planning: This social innovation allows communities to plan and develop systems that cater solutions to their specific local needs by using their historical knowledge and other local resources.
 Emissions trading: The Emissions Trading program was designed to address issues associated with the continuous increase in pollution. The program provides solutions such as setting a cap on the amount that certain pollutants can be emitted, and implementing a permit system to control the amount of pollution produced by each participating business. If a business needs to use more pollution than permitted, it can purchase credits from a business that has not emitted its maximum permitted amount. The goal of the Emissions Trading program is that, over time and with increased awareness, society will limit the types and the numbers of pollutants emitted to what is only necessary.
 Fair trade: Products including coffee, sugar, and chocolate are currently being traded without high standards that result in tough conditions for farmers and a less sustainable environment. Fair trade is a movement that certifies traders to exchange with the farmers that produce these products. The idea behind this movement is that by being paid a living-wage, being able to meet social and environmental standards and promoting "environmental sustainability, the lives of these farmers will be improved.
 Habitat conservation plans: Habitat Conservation Plans is an effort by the US Fish and Wild Life Service and the Environmental Protection Agency to protect species and their endangerment by providing economical incentives to conserve their habitats and protect these species from endangerment.
 Individual Development Accounts: This social innovation is made to support the working poor with saving decisions that they have made to better enhance their lives. This initiative will give $2 per every $1 saved by the working poor for College tuition, purchasing a home, starting a business, and other similar and productive initiatives. This is made possible by philanthropic, government and corporate sponsors that donate to this cause.
 International labor standards: Labor standards differ country-to-country, with some agreeably better than others. In effort to internationally align these, the International Labor Organization, participating governments, and employees contributed to the development of standards that protect workers’ rights to freedom, equity, security, and human dignity".
 Microfinance: This social innovation is created to support those financially unable to gain access to financial services such as banking, lending, and insurance. The ultimate goal of Microfinance is to enable an escape from poverty by helping to improve the living conditions and financial viability among the impoverished program participants.
 Socially responsible investing: "An investment strategy that attempts to maximize both financial and social returns. Investors generally favor businesses and other organizations whose practices support environmental sustainability, human rights, and consumer protection."
 Supported employment: Supported employment is a social innovation geared towards helping disabled or disadvantaged workers who are un- or under-employed due to their condition obtain suitable employment. The Support Employment service provides access to job coaches, transportation, assistive technology, specialized job training, and individual tailored supervision in effort to help program participants become more competitive applicants and better prepared overall for the job market.

Developments since 2000 
Academic research, blogs and websites feature social innovation, along with organizations working on the boundaries of research and practical action. Topics include:

 Innovation in public services was pioneered particularly in some Scandinavian and Asian countries. Governments are increasingly recognizing that innovation requires healthcare, schooling and democracy.
 Social entrepreneurship, which is the practice of creating new organizations focusing on non-market activities.
 Responsible Research and Innovation, which takes into account effects and potential impacts on the environment and society. It includes Engagement of all societal actors (researchers, industry, policymakers and civil society); Gender Equality; Science Education; Open Access; Ethics; and Governance.
 Online volunteering, a free service launched in 2000 whereby individuals from all over the world contribute to the needs of development organizations and public institutions
 Open source innovation, in which the intellectual property involved in a product or service is made freely available.
 Complex adaptive systems, which have built-in mechanisms to help them adapt to changing circumstances.
 Collaborative approaches which involve stakeholders who are not directly responsible for some activity, such as stockholders and unions collaborating on business issue and business collaborating with government on regulatory issues.
  Innovation diffusion
 Localized influences  that make some localities particularly innovative. Institutional or system entrepreneurship which focuses on agents who work at a broad system level in order to create the conditions which will allow innovations to have a lasting impact.
 Business, particularly in services.
 Social innovation in tourism development''', which involve creation of innovative and appropriate development strategies to involve local communities as a key agent in the decision-making and planning of tourism destinations.

Institutional support
The United States created an Office for Social Innovation in the White House, which is funding projects that combine public and private resources. with foundations that support social innovation. In 2010, the US government listed 11 investments made by its 'Social Innovation Fund', with public funding more than matched by philanthropic organizations. This fund focuses on partnerships with charities, social enterprises, and business. Moreover, educational institutions are now increasingly supporting teaching and research in the area of social innovation. In addition to pioneered efforts by institutions such as the Harvard Business School's Initiative on Social Enterprise (launched 1993) and Said Business School's Skoll Centre for Social Entrepreneurship (launched 2003),  INSEAD and other universities now offer short-term programs in Social Innovation, and a few such as Cambridge Centre for Social Innovation, Cambridge Judge Business School, University of Cambridge, and Goldsmiths, University of London offer Masters courses dedicated entirely to the study of theory and practice in relation to social entrepreneurship and innovation. The Cambridge Centre for Social Innovation's aim is to build best practices across business, civil society, policy and academia for a more equitable, inclusive and sustainable world.

Public policy makers support social innovation in the UK, Australia, China and Denmark, as well. The European Union's innovation strategy was the first well-funded research and development strategy to emphasize social innovation.

In 2002, the South Australian government, led by Premier and Social Inclusion Minister Mike Rann, embraced a ten-year social innovation strategy with big investments and a focus on reform in areas such as homelessness, school retention, mental health and disability services.

The Common Ground and Street to Home homelessness initiatives and the Australian Centre for Social Innovation were established in Adelaide and many reforms trialed in South Australia have been adopted nationally throughout Australia. This initiative, headed by Monsignor David Cappo, South Australia's Social Inclusion Commissioner, was advised by 'Thinkers in Residence' Geoff Mulgan and New York social entrepreneur Rosanne Haggerty.

Role in curbing corruption 
Lin and Chen, in "The Impact of Societal and Social innovation: a case-based approach" have argued that social innovation's goal is to produce actions that are "socially valuable and good for many".

In governance, its main role is to enhance and maximize the trust of citizens through active involvement in society, whether in the public or private sphere. Social innovation's role in curbing corruption is carried out through two main mediums. Firstly, it is institutionalized through actors (in the public and the private sectors), and secondly, it is executed with new tools available, specifically ICTs.

Local and regional development
Literature on social innovation in relation to territorial/regional development covers innovation in the social economy, i.e. strategies for satisfaction of human needs; and innovation in the sense of transforming and/or sustaining social relations, especially governance relations at the regional and local level. Beginning in the late 1980s, Jean-Louis Laville and Frank Moulaert researched social innovation. In Canada CRISES initiated this type of research. Another, larger project was SINGOCOM a European Commission Framework 5 project, which pioneered so-called "Alternative Models for Local Innovation" (ALMOLIN). These models were further elaborated through community actions covered by KATARSIS and SOCIAL POLIS. More recent works focus on the societal role of the economic life in terms of innovations in social practices and social relations at the local and regional levels. Social Innovation, therefore, is increasingly seen as a process and a strategy to foster human development through solidarity, cooperation, and cultural diversity.

The EU funded URBACT programme is designed to help cities to exchange and learn around urban policies.  The URBACT methodology can be seen as a social innovation action planning approach. A typical URBACT network would have ten cities working on a specific theme such as active inclusion or regenerating disadvantaged neighbourhoods.  They examine good practice and then working through a local support group use the results to inform their local action plan.

The Social Innovation Europe initiative, funded by the European Commission's Directorate General for Enterprise and Industry, was set up to map social innovation at a European level, by creating a directory of grass-roots examples of social innovation from across the 27 member states.

The European Commission funded the SELUSI study between 2008 - 2013 that looked at over 550 social ventures and examined how these insights can spark change and innovation at a much larger scale. It looked at business models of social ventures in five countries - UK being one of them – identifying which specific practices evolved by social ventures are particularly successful, and how and by whom – be it social enterprise, public sector body or mainstream business – they can be most effectively scaled-up.

The European Commission has launched a new initiative (project) in 2013 under FP7 funding, with the aim to build a network of incubators for social innovation across regions and countries. This network facilitates identification of 300 social innovation examples and facilitates its scaling. The network is organised in a way to identify new models for scaling of social innovations across various geographical clusters in collaboration with each other, communicating the ideas, finding the tools and funds, developing business plans and models in order to promote the new promising ideas throughout Europe.

 A guide also exists that provides a way to promote social innovations at a local or regional level.

Some noted scholars
 Akhtar Hameed Khan
 Frank Moulaert
 Geoff Mulgan
 Ted London
 Jürgen Howaldt
 Frances Westley

See also
 appropriate technology
 civil society
 post fordism
 social capital
 social entrepreneurship
 sustainopreneurship
 Online volunteering
 Social entrepreneurship in south asia

References (books)

Europe Tomorrow, (2015) "Europe tour of Social & Environmental innovation".
Social innovation exchange, (2015) "worldwide social innovation exchange".
 Hubert A. (ed.) (2010). Empowering People, Driving Change: Social Innovation in the European Union. Brussels: BEPA – Bureau of European Policy Advisers.
 Kleinert S., Horton R. (2013). Health in Europe – Successes, Failures, and New Challenges. The Lancet, 381: 1073–1074. 
 Mulgan G., Tucker S., Rushanara A., Sanders B. (2007). Social Innovation. What it is, why it matters and how it can be accelerated. London: The Young Foundation.
 Mulgan G. (2019) Social Innovation: how societies find the power to change, Bristol, Policy Press
 Murray R., Caulier-Grice J., Mulgan G. (2010). The Open Book of Social Innovation. London: The Young Foundation and Nesta.
 Stott, N., Fava, M. and Slawinski, N. (2019) "Community social innovation: taking a long view on community enterprise." In: George, G., Baker, T., Tracey, P. and Joshi, H. (Eds.) Handbook of inclusive innovation: the role of organizations, markets and communities in social innovation. Cheltenham: Edward Elgar 
 Stott, N., Fava, M., Tracey, P. and Claus, L. (2018) "Leading urgent acts of categorisation: the construction of 'community anchor organizations'." In: Leading Social Innovation Symposium, Academy of Management Annual Meeting, 10–14 August 2018, Chicago, IL, USA.
 Stott, N., Fava, M., Tracey, P. and Claus, L. (2018) "Playing well with others? Community cross-sector work in poor places." In: Re-thinking Cross-Sector Social Innovation Conference, 6–7 April 2018, Social Innovation and Change Initiative, Harvard Kennedy School, Cambridge, MA, USA.
 Stott, N. and Tracey, P. (2018) "Organizing and innovating in poor places." Innovation: Organization and Management, 20(1): 1-17 (DOI: 10.1080/14479338.2017.1358093)
 Tracey, P. and Phillips, N. (2016) "Managing the consequences of organizational stigmatization: identity work in a social enterprise." Academy of Management Journal, 59(3): 740-765 (DOI: 10.5465/amj.2013.0483) 
 Tracey, P. and Stott, N. (2017) Social innovation: a window on alternative ways of organizing and innovating. Innovation: Organization and Management, 19(1): 51-60 (DOI: 10.1080/14479338.2016.1268924)
 Westley, F, Zimmerman, G., Patton, MQ (2006). Getting to Maybe: How the World is Changed. Toronto Random House
 Westley, F., McGowan, K., Tjornbo, O. (2017). The Evolution of Social Innovation. London. Edward Elgar Press

References

Civil society
Innovation
Social influence
Social issues
Public administration